Avantika is an Indian Marathi language television series which aired on Alpha TV Marathi. The series premiered in 2002 and ended on 25 March 2005 after completing 738 episodes by replacing Abhalmaya. The show starred Mrinal Kulkarni in lead role. It was produced by Smita Talwalkar under the banner of Asmita Productions.

Cast 
 Mrinal Kulkarni as Avantika Jahagirdar (née Dixit)
 Sandeep Kulkarni as Saurabh Jahagirdar
 Girish Oak as Aravind Dixit
 Ravindra Mankani as Shashank
 Subodh Bhave as Salil Dixit
 Sharvani Pillai as Sanika Patil (née Dixit)
 Sunil Barve as Anish Patekar
 Suchitra Bandekar as Urmila Pradhan (née Karnik)
 Rahul Mehendale as Shailesh
 Parth Ketkar as Tejas
 Sarika Nilatkar-Nawathe as Maithili
 Shreyas Talpade as Abhishek Jahagirdar
 Sulekha Talwalkar as Ashwini Dalal
 Aadesh Bandekar as Milind Pradhan
 Pushkar Shrotri as Avinash Patil
 Tushar Dalvi
 Sonali Khare
 Manoj Joshi
 Smita Talwalkar
 Deepa Lagoo 
 Pournima Talwalkar
 Vandana Sardesai-Waknis

Awards

References

External links 
 

Marathi-language television shows
Zee Marathi original programming
2002 Indian television series debuts
2005 Indian television series endings